The 1970 Chicago Cubs season was the 99th season of the Chicago Cubs franchise, the 95th in the National League and the 55th at Wrigley Field. The Cubs finished second in the National League East with a record of 84–78 by five games, which was the closest by game margin that the Cubs finished between 1945 and 1984.

Offseason 
 November 17, 1969: Oscar Gamble and Dick Selma were traded by the Cubs to the Philadelphia Phillies for Johnny Callison and a player to be named later. The Phillies completed the deal by sending Larry Colton to the Cubs in January 1970.

March 
With the trade of Gamble, who was the starting center fielder in late 1969, and Selma, who was the fourth starter in the starting pitching rotation, Manager Leo Durocher had decisions to make about who would play center, who would play right (Callison's natural position, but the Cubs already had a right fielder in Jim Hickman), and who would be the fourth starting pitcher. Durocher decided to make rookie Joe Decker the fourth starter, play Callison in right, and move Hickman to center. Because Hickman was an older, slower player, Durocher decided to spell him late in games with a faster, younger center fielder, Cleo James.

Catcher Randy Hundley was injured in spring training, so the Cubs made a surprising trade in acquiring veteran catcher J.C. Martin from the New York Mets, the Cubs’ biggest rivals.

April 
Hundley missed only the season-opening road trip, but was back in the lineup when the team returned to Wrigley Field on April 14. On April 21, however, he suffered an even more serious injury at a play at the plate. Hundley would end up catching only 73 games for the Cubs. This was a serious blow to the Cubs’ season, as Durocher said Hundley "meant at least ten games in the standings."

The Cubs had a great April, standing at 12–3 on April 27, a start so hot it would not be matched by any Cub team until 2020. The team finished the month in first place by 2-1/2 games.

However, rowdy fans throwing garbage on the field and jumping onto it caused the Cubs to make rare mid-season changes to the dimensions of the ballpark by putting a chain-link basket around the top of the outfield walls to keep garbage and fans off the field, and mortaring concrete triangles on the top of the outfield walls so people could not walk on them.

May 
The highlight of May was future Hall-of-Fame first baseman Ernie Banks’ 500th home run on May 12. With Hundley out and Martin a low-batting average hitter, the Cubs acquired catcher Jack Hiatt that same day. 

May 29 saw the Cubs make another trade that ended up hurting the team when they traded relief pitcher Ted Abernathy to the St. Louis Cardinals for infielder Phil Gagliano. Abernathy would go on to the Kansas City Royals and become one of the top relief pitchers in the American League in 1970 and 1971. Gagliano would hit .150 for the Cubs and be traded before the season ended.

The Cubs ended May in first place by two games over the Mets.

June 
A 12-game losing streak, which included losing five straight to the New York Mets in Wrigley Field, knocked the Cubs out of first place. That month also saw a controversy blow up in which Manager Durocher was withholding information from the media and the players, only to reveal it on his evening radio show on WIND-AM. Because of the distraction the show was causing, Durocher gave it up to concentrate on managing.

With Cub bullpen closer Phil Regan faltering, the Cubs on June 23 acquired relief pitcher Roberto Rodriguez. Also on June 23, with Decker having won only one game, the Cubs acquired starting pitcher Milt Pappas to be their fourth starter. Pappas was another player who had had a reputation as a problem player with other clubs.

The team ended the month in third place, 3-1/2 games behind.

July 
Needing a left handed reliever, the Cubs acquired Juan Pizarro, yet another player with a reputation for carousing. Hundley finally rejoined the team. On July 29, the Cubs made their biggest move of the year, acquiring Joe Pepitone from the Houston Astros. Pepitone was a starter the rest of the way, usually in center field, with Hickman moving to first base with Banks on the bench, or to right field with Callison on the bench. Pepitone became hugely popular among fans. The Cubs at the end of the month remained in third place, three games behind.

August 
August saw a rare three-team pennant race develop among the Cubs, Mets, and Pittsburgh Pirates. A stellar Cub road trip to the West Coast, ending with three victories against the San Diego Padres, ended the month with the Cubs in second place, only one game behind the Pirates.

September 
September saw the three teams engage in a classic, tight pennant race. Cub management opened their wallets in an all-out attempt to win it, acquiring relief pitchers Bob Miller and Hoyt Wilhelm and outfielder and former two-time National League batting champion Tommy Davis.

On Sep 3, outfielder Billy Williams did not play after having played in 1,117 consecutive games, then a National League record.

In a pivotal matchup between the Cubs and Pirates on Sep 13, the Cubs were down 2–1 with two outs in the ninth inning. A loss would have put them three games behind and out of the race, but Pirate center fielder Matty Alou dropped a fly ball that would have ended the game, and the Cubs ended up rallying to win.

But in a season in which the Cubs were under .500 on the road, a 14-game road trip that ended the season resulted in enough losses that the Cubs finished second, five games behind the Pirates. The Cubs were only 14–14 for the month, and 4–6 in their last ten games. On the road trip, third baseman Ron Santo played despite having received several death threats.

Season standings

Record vs. opponents

Notable transactions 
 March 29, 1970: Randy Bobb was traded by the Cubs to the New York Mets for J.C. Martin.
 April 22, 1970: Jim Qualls was traded by the Cubs to the Montreal Expos for Garry Jestadt.
 April 23, 1970: Steve Barber was signed as a free agent by the Cubs.
 May 12, 1970: Jack Hiatt was purchased from the Montreal Expos.
 May 29, 1970: Ted Abernathy was traded by the Cubs to the St. Louis Cardinals for Phil Gagliano.
 June 23, 1970: Don Young was traded by the Cubs to the Oakland Athletics for Roberto Rodriguez.
 June 23, 1970: Milt Pappas was purchased from the Atlanta Braves.
 June 30, 1970: Steve Barber was released by the Cubs.
 July 9, 1970: Archie Reynolds was traded to the California Angels for Juan Pizarro.
 July 29, 1970: Joe Pepitone was purchased by the Cubs from the Houston Astros.
 September 1, 1970: Bob Miller was purchased from the Chicago White Sox.
 September 16, 1970: Tommy Davis was purchased from the Oakland Athletics.
 September 21, 1970: Hoyt Wilhelm was selected off waivers by the Cubs from the Atlanta Braves.

Draft picks 
 June 4, 1970: 1970 Major League Baseball draft
Rick Reuschel was drafted by the Cubs in the 3rd round.
Jeff Schneider was drafted by the Cubs in the 18th round, but did not sign.

Roster

Player stats

Batting

Starters by position 
Note: Pos = Position; G = Games played; AB = At bats; H = Hits; Avg. = Batting average; HR = Home runs; RBI = Runs batted in

Other batters 
Note: G = Games played; AB = At bats; H = Hits; Avg. = Batting average; HR = Home runs; RBI = Runs batted in

Pitching

Starting pitchers 
Note: G = Games pitched; IP = Innings pitched; W = Wins; L = Losses; ERA = Earned run average; SO = Strikeouts

Other pitchers 
Note: G = Games pitched; IP = Innings pitched; W = Wins; L = Losses; ERA = Earned run average; SO = Strikeouts

Relief pitchers 
Note: G = Games pitched; W = Wins; L = Losses; SV = Saves; ERA = Earned run average; SO = Strikeouts

Farm system 

LEAGUE CHAMPIONS: Quincy

Notes

References 
 Corbett, Warren. “Milt Pappas.” Society for American Baseball Research, https://sabr.org/bioproj/person/44e56ef0.
 Costello, Rory. “Juan Pizarro.” Society for American Baseball Research, https://sabr.org/bioproj/person/bb767482.

1970 Chicago Cubs season at Baseball Reference
"Hundley The Answer?" The Sporting News, September 4, 1971.

Chicago Cubs seasons
Chicago Cubs season
Chicago Cubs